Oleksandr Chyzhevskyi (born 27 May 1971) is a Ukrainian football coach for Ahrobiznes Volochysk and a former player. He is on the fourth place the all-time appearance leader in the Vyscha Liha.

Playing career
On 12 December 2009 he played his 400th game in the Ukrainian Premier League (Top League) in an away game of FC Zakarpattia Uzhhorod against FC Vorskla Poltava. Chyzhevskyi became the first player to reach 300 mark for games played in the league.

Chyzhevskyi made his debut for Ukraine on 15 July 1998 in a home loss to Poland (1–2). He was replaced during half-time break by Vladyslav Vashchuk.

Honours
 Ukrainian Cup (finalist, 2): 1993, 1999
 Soviet Second League (1): 1991

References

External links 
Official website profile

1971 births
Living people
Footballers from Lutsk
Ukrainian footballers
Lviv State University of Physical Culture alumni
Ukraine international footballers
Ukrainian Premier League players
Ukrainian First League players
Ukrainian Second League players
FC Hoverla Uzhhorod players
FC Karpaty Lviv players
FC Lviv (1992) players
FC Karpaty-2 Lviv players
FC Shakhtar Donetsk players
FC Shakhtar-2 Donetsk players
FC Volyn Lutsk players
SC Tavriya Simferopol players
FC Metalurh Zaporizhzhia players
FC Metalurh-2 Zaporizhzhia players
SSSOR Metalurh Zaporizhzhia players
Ukrainian football managers
Association football defenders
Ukrainian Premier League managers
Ukrainian First League managers
FC Karpaty Lviv managers
FC Ahrobiznes Volochysk managers
Sportspeople from Volyn Oblast